The Welsh Liberal Democrats are a branch of the United Kingdom Liberal Democrats that operates in Wales. The party is led by Jane Dodds, who served as MP for Brecon and Radnorshire from August to December 2019, and MS for Mid and West Wales since May 2021.  The party currently has 1 elected member in the Senedd and no Welsh seats in the UK House of Commons, but does have several members of the House of Lords. The party had 69 local councilors serving in principal authorities as of the 2022 local authority elections, up 10 from 2017.

Mark Williams, then-Leader of the Welsh Liberal Democrats, was defeated at the 2017 general election in his Ceredigion constituency by Ben Lake of Plaid Cymru, whose majority of 104 made the seat one of the most marginal in the country. The result left the party without an MP in Wales; the party and its predecessors had continuously held parliamentary seats in Wales since the formation of the Liberal Party in 1859.

Organisation

Leader of the Welsh Liberal Democrats

Welsh Liberal Democrat Officers
President of the Welsh Liberal Democrats: Paula Yates
Deputy President: Monica French
Leader of the Welsh Liberal Democrats: Jane Dodds
Deputy Leader (Westminster): Christine Humphreys

Youth wing
The youth wing of the party is Welsh Young Liberals.
Chair: Joe Thomas

Policy platform
The Welsh Liberal Democrats promote liberalism as their main ideology, as well as further devolved powers for the Senedd with the aim of establishing a federal UK.

Elected representatives
Members of the Senedd (MSs)

Appointments

House of Lords

History

Before 1945

The Liberal Council for Wales was founded by David Lloyd George in 1897. This makes the Welsh Liberals the oldest of the political parties in Wales. It was the first to establish a truly Welsh identity. During the late 19th and early 20th centuries the Welsh Liberals were a home of radical Welsh nationalism. Through politicians such as T. E. ("Tom") Ellis and David Gee and the movement of Cymru Fydd (Wales to be [future]) Welsh nationalism was comparable at times to that occurring in Ireland. But in Wales the nationalist passion never spilled over into violence, and was also counterbalanced by the strong English Liberal capitalist base present within the party. In 1906 the Welsh Liberals reached their peak when 35 of Wales' 36 seats had MPs who took the Liberal whip. Until 1922 the Welsh Liberals dominated Welsh politics and also played a central role in British politics. William Harcourt, Reginald McKenna, David Alfred Thomas, 1st Viscount Rhondda, Sir Alfred Mond and David Lloyd George were just a few of the politicians who held central positions in the party and in the various Liberal-led governments from 1906 to 1922. The various splits within the Liberal Party from 1918 onwards, the rise of the Welsh Labour Party in South Wales, and the dominance of Lloyd George over the Welsh Liberal Party, all had their impact on Welsh Liberal fortunes. Despite this it was in Wales that the pre-war Liberals' support lasted longest in post-war British politics.

1945–1983

In 1945 the party had 7 MPs in Wales, mainly in the Welsh-speaking north, mid and west Wales seats. Two of these MPs Gwilym Lloyd George (Pembrokeshire) and Megan Lloyd George (Anglesey)) defected to the Conservative and Labour parties, respectively. Clement Davies, who held Montgomeryshire, became the post-war British Liberal leader. Davies died in 1962 and was succeeded by Emlyn Hooson, who then set about rebuilding the Welsh Liberal Party. When the last of the post-war Welsh Liberal MPs, Roderic Bowen (Cardiganshire), lost his seat in the 1966 general election Hooson, Lord Ogmore, Martin Thomas (Lord Thomas of Gresford), Roger Roberts (Lord Roberts of Llandudno) and Mary Murphy established the Welsh Liberal Party as a separate state party within the Liberal Party's federal structure. After its establishment in September 1966 the Liberal Party in Wales had limited success and never really enjoyed a great Liberal revival like that which had occurred under Jo Grimond in Scotland. Geraint Howells' election in Cardiganshire in February 1974 re-established the Liberal presence in that seat. In 1979, however, the Welsh Liberals suffered from the Lib-Lab pact, and support for the failed devolution referendum resulted in a poor election for the Liberals: over half of their 28 candidates lost their deposit. More importantly Emlyn Hooson lost his Montgomeryshire seat, leaving the Welsh party once more with a single seat (Howells' in Cardiganshire). Hooson was ennobled later that year and joined Howells once more at Westminster.

1983–1997

The arrival of the Social Democratic Party (SDP) in Wales and the formation of the SDP–Liberal Alliance gave the party an electoral boost, increased its representation on councils and helped retake the Montgomeryshire seat in 1983 (Alex Carlile) and win the Brecon and Radnor seat in a famous by-election in 1985 (Richard Livsey). In 1988 the SDP and most of the Liberals merged in Wales and after various names the three Welsh MPs insisted on the name being Welsh Liberal Democrats, which set a precedent for the rest of the Liberal Party. In the 1992 United Kingdom general election Howells lost his seat and went to the Lords, Livsey lost Brecon and Radnor, which he would retake five years later. This left Alex Carlile as the sole Liberal Democrat MP. In 1996 Carlile announced his resignation and he was in turn replaced by Lembit Öpik. When Carlile stood down it ended the direct link with the professional Liberal barrister MPs that had been existent in the Welsh Liberal party for its whole history. Carlile became Lord Carlile of Berriew in 1999. Followed in 2001 by Richard Livsey (of Talgarth) and Roger Roberts (of Llandudno) in 2004.

1997–2017

In the 1997 general election both Öpik and Livsey won their seats. Both then went forward to support the successful 1997 Welsh Assembly referendum. They were joined in that campaign by other prominent figures in the Welsh party, including Michael German, Jenny Randerson, Peter Black, Roger Williams and Rob Humphreys. Except for Humphreys, they all soon gained electoral office, in either the Welsh Assembly or the Westminster Parliament. The Welsh Assembly elections in 1999 provided the party with six more elected representatives for Wales to join their two MPs, and three Welsh lords. At Westminster Roger Williams took over from Richard Livsey in Brecon and Radnor in 2001. In 2005 Mark Williams won the Ceredigion seat (formerly held by Geraint Howells); and Jenny Willott won the Cardiff Central seat, which was the first Liberal urban seat victory in Wales since 1935 and the first female Liberal MP in Wales since 1951. The four MPs were also the most since 1950 for the Liberal Party in Wales. It was Lembit Öpik who now headed the party at Westminster.

In 1998 Michael German was elected as designate leader Welsh Assembly group and led their 1999 election campaign and then the new Assembly group. Between 2001 and 2003, the party were in a coalition with Welsh Labour in the National Assembly. In this Labour-led government Michael German was Deputy Minister whilst Jenny Randerson also held a ministerial post. Randerson's post made her the first female Liberal in the party's history to hold ministerial office. The Welsh Liberals achieved a breakthrough in local government in 2003, leading Swansea, Bridgend, Cardiff and Wrexham councils, with cabinet members on many more Welsh councils. In the 2003 Welsh Assembly elections the party remained stuck on six AMs (Assembly Members). They remained on this figure in the 2007 elections but were reduced to five in the 2011 elections. In 2008 German stood down as leader and was replaced by Kirsty Williams (the AM for Brecon and Radnor) in a contest with Jenny Randerson (Cardiff Central). Both German and Randerson subsequently went to the House of Lords. Baroness Randerson become the first ever Welsh female Liberal peer to sit in the House of Lords. Her two predecessors Viscountess St Davids and the 2nd Viscountess Rhondda, who had been ennobled in the first half of the 20th century, had died before women were allowed to sit in the House of Lords. Michael German was succeeded as the Assembly member for South Wales East by his wife Veronica German. In May 2011, however, she failed to be re-elected in South Wales East.

In September 2012 Baroness Randerson was appointed as the unpaid Parliamentary Under Secretary of State at the Wales Office. This was the first time a Welsh Liberal Democrat had held ministerial office at Westminster since 1945. Randerson was also the first female politician from the Welsh Liberals ever to hold a UK ministerial office.

2017–present
Following the result of the 2017 UK general election, the Liberal Democrats were left without an MP in Wales, a situation which had not occurred since the founding of the Liberal Party in 1859. In the autumn of 2017, the leadership election was held, with two candidates, Jane Dodds and Elizabeth Evans, taking part. On 3 November 2017, Dodds was announced as the winner and immediately took over as leader.

In August 2019, Dodds regained House of Commons representation for the Welsh Liberal Democrats, winning the 2019 Brecon and Radnorshire by-election. However her stay in the House of Commons proved to be a short one, as she lost her seat by 7,131 votes at the December 2019 general election. With this the party yet again was left without any MPs.

In the aftermath of the result, BBC Wales' Political Editor Felicity Evans stated that the Lib Dems would "rue the day they pushed for this election".

Dodds gained a regional seat in Mid and West Wales at the 2021 Senedd election to become the party's only MS. The seat was only held by 714 votes.

Electoral performance

House of Commons
This chart shows the electoral results of the Welsh Liberals, and later Liberal Democrats, from its first election in 1900. Total numbers of parliamentary seats, and vote percentages, are for Wales only.

Senedd

See also
Liberal Democrats
English Liberal Democrats
Scottish Liberal Democrats
Northern Ireland Liberal Democrats

References

External links 

 

1988 establishments in Wales
Liberal parties in the United Kingdom
Organisation of the Liberal Democrats (UK)
Political parties established in 1988